The 1896 Canadian federal election was held on June 23, 1896, to elect members of the House of Commons of Canada of the 8th Parliament of Canada. Though the Conservative Party, led by Prime Minister Charles Tupper, won a plurality of the popular vote, the Liberal Party, led by Wilfrid Laurier, won the majority of seats to form the next government. The election ended 18 years of Conservative rule.

Description
The governing Conservative Party, since the death of John A. Macdonald in 1891, was disorganized. Following Macdonald's death, John Abbott spent a year as Prime Minister before handing over to John Thompson. Thompson proved a relatively popular Prime Minister, but his sudden death in December 1894 resulted in his replacement by Mackenzie Bowell, whose tenure as Prime Minister proved a disaster. The Conservatives soon became viewed as corrupt and wasteful of public funds, partially due to the McGreevy-Langevin Scandal. Issues like the Manitoba Schools Question had cost the party support in both French and English Canada.

Though Bowell nominally remained Prime Minister until the election was called, leadership of the Conservative Party had been functionally taken over by Sir Charles Tupper, a Father of Confederation and former Premier of Nova Scotia. Earlier, in February 1896, Tupper introduced remedial legislation to settle the Manitoba dispute, but it was filibustered by an alliance of extreme Protestants led by Dalton McCarthy and the Liberals. This filibuster resulted in Tupper abandoning the bill and asking for a dissolution. Parliament was dissolved on April 24, 1896, and, in accordance with an agreement between Bowell and Tupper that the latter would become Prime Minister following the election call, he became prime minister on May 1, 1896, thus forming the 7th Canadian Ministry.

Tupper argued that the real issue of the election was the future of Canadian industry, and he insisted that Conservatives needed to unite to defeat the Patrons of Industry. However, the Conservatives were so bitterly divided over the Manitoba Schools Question that wherever he spoke, he was faced with a barrage of criticism, most notably at a two-hour address he gave at Massey Hall in Toronto, which was constantly interrupted by the crowd.

The election saw a great change in the Liberal Party. While the Liberals had traditionally been the party for radical change and free trade, in the 1896 election, they embraced a much more conservative platform. That helped many of the traditional supporters of the Conservative Party move to the Liberals. The most important change was Laurier's support of the National Policy, an important cause to the powerful business interests of Montreal and Toronto.  The Liberal campaign was directed by an ex-Conservative, Joseph Israël Tarte. Laurier was also a strong supporter of provincial rights, and a number of powerful Liberal premiers supported the campaign, such as Ontario's Oliver Mowat and Nova Scotia's W. S. Fielding, both of whom who won seats in the House and were appointed to cabinet after the election.

Ending up, no party took a majority of the votes. The two main parties were over-represented in the House of Commons. The election fits the definition of a wrong-winner election - the party with the most votes did not take more seats than a less-popular party. The Conservatives won more votes in the 1896 election than the Liberals (48.2% of the votes in comparison to 41.4% for the Liberals). However, the Liberals took more seats. The Conservatives captured about half of the seats in English Canada. They suffered losses in Quebec, where Tupper's reputation as an ardent imperialist was a major handicap. Tupper's inability to persuade Joseph-Adolphe Chapleau to return to active politics as his Quebec lieutenant ended any chances of the Conservatives winning the most seats that province. Meanwhile, Laurier's Liberals won a landslide victory in Quebec, as well as getting some seats in English Canada (especially in the Maritimes and the West).

Although Laurier had won the election on June 24, Tupper initially refused to cede power, insisting that Laurier would be unable to form a government even if the Liberal Party had won 55% of the seats in the House of Commons. However, when Tupper attempted to make appointments as prime minister, Governor General Lord Aberdeen refused. Tupper resigned, and the governor general invited Laurier to form a government. Laurier's government went on to last the usual four years.

National results 

Note:

* Party did not nominate candidates in the previous election.

Acclamations:

The following Members of Parliament were elected by acclamation;
 Ontario: 1 Patron of Industry
 Quebec: 1 Conservative, 2 Liberals

Results by province 

George Ritchie Maxwell elected in Burrard.

Further reading
 
 Blake, Donald E. "1896 and All That: Critical Elections in Canada", Canadian Journal of Political Science, June 1979, Vol. 12 Issue 2, pp. 259–280

See also
 
List of Canadian federal general elections
List of political parties in Canada
8th Canadian Parliament

Notes

References

External links
Election 1896, by Stephen Azzi

 Federal
1896
June 1896 events